Euchromius ocellea, the necklace veneer, is a moth of the family Crambidae described by Adrian Hardy Haworth in 1811. It is a widespread species, found in tropical and subtropical regions, but migrates to Europe.

The wingspan is 16–27 mm. The ground colour of the forewings is creamy white, densely suffused with ochreous to dark brown scales. The posterior area sometimes has a yellowish spot. The hindwings are creamy white to grey brown. In southern Africa, adults are on wing from October to April. In eastern Africa there seem to be two flight periods with adults on wing from November to February and again from June to July. In western Africa the flight period ranges from November to March.

The larvae feed on maize (Zea mays) and sorghum (Sorghum bicolor).

References

External links

 
 UKmoths

Crambinae
Cosmopolitan moths
Moths described in 1811
Moths of Africa
Moths of Europe
Taxa named by Adrian Hardy Haworth